The 76.2 mm D-56T series rifled tank gun is the tank gun used on the PT-76, which is the only known armoured vehicle to carry it.

Description
The D-56T is an anti-tank gun of 76.2mm calibre. It can fire five types of rounds, using a manual loader system, it has an effective fire rate of six to eight rounds per minute. It has a max effective range of approximately 1500 meters. This gun is 42 calibers long. 

A typical combat ammunition load consists of 24 x OF-350 Frag-HE, 4 x sub-caliber AP-T, 4 x AP-T and 8 x BK-350M HEAT rounds. 

The gun is usually mounted in an oval dish-type circular truncated cone turret with flat sloping sides which is mounted over the second, third, and fourth pair of road wheels. All PT-76s have a fume extractor for the main gun at the rear of the turret. Some were fitted with a multi-slotted muzzle brake. Most PT-76s typically feature this gun with a double-baffle muzzle brake, except the PT-76B, which is typically fitted with the D-56T gun with a two-plane gun stabiliser, a double-baffle muzzle brake and a bore evacuator towards the muzzle.

Ammunition
The D-56T usually saw itself firing five types of anti-tank rounds. Most rounds that were used on the D-56T were HE rounds, with usually a ready combat load having 24 pieces of OF-350 High Explosive Fragmentation ammunition, and 16 other pieces, with three other types of rounds. Common ammunition types were the OF-350 Frag-HE, BM-354P HVAP-T and the BK-350M HEAT-FS.

BK-350M High Explosive Anti Tank, Fin Stabilised
Maximum aimed range: 1,000 m
Maximum effective range: 650 in the day, 600 at night
Penetration: 280mm at all distances

OF-350 Fragmentation, High Explosive
Maximum aimed range: 4,000 m
Maximum effective range: 600 at night

BM-354P High-Velocity, Armor-Piercing Tracer
Maximum aimed range: 1,060 m
Maximum effective range: 650 in the day, 600 at night
Penetration: 127 mm point-blank, 50 mm at 1,000 metres

See also
PT-76

References
 

Tank guns of the Soviet Union
Cold War artillery of the Soviet Union